Below are the names and numbers of the LSWR N15 class/SR 'King Arthur' Class locomotives.  Another successful publicity campaign by the Southern Railway when named from 1925 onwards, they represented the counties of Devon and Somerset, UK, due to their association with the legend of King Arthur.  The batches have been separated for ease of reference.

The Urie Arthurs

The Eastleigh Arthurs

The Scotch Arthurs

References 

4-6-0 locomotives
Arthurian legend
N15
 King Arthur class locomotives, List of
British railway-related lists
N15